William Jessop (2 April 1922 – May 1994) was an English professional footballer who played as a winger. He made appearances in the English Football League for Preston North End, Stockport County, Oldham Athletic and Wrexham. He also played non-league football for Bloxwich Strollers.

References

1922 births
1994 deaths
English footballers
Association football wingers
Preston North End F.C. players
Stockport County F.C. players
Oldham Athletic A.F.C. players
Wrexham A.F.C. players
Bloxwich Strollers F.C. players
English Football League players
Footballers from Preston, Lancashire